11Q18 is a Dead Sea Scroll discovered in Cave 11 that speaks of a New Jerusalem.

Bibliography

García Martínez, F., The Last Surviving Columns of 11QNJ," in F. García Martínez et al. (eds.), The Scriptures and the Scrolls: Studies in Honour of A.S. van der Woude on the Occasion of his 65th Birthday (VTSup 49; Leiden: E. J. Brill, 1992) 178-192, pls. 3-9.
García Martínez, F., E.J.C. Tigchelaar, A.S. van der Woude, DJD XXIII, 305-355, pls. XXXV-XL, LIII.
Jongeling, B., "Publication provisoire d'un fragment provenant de la grotte 11 de Qumran (11QJérNouv ar)," JSJ 1 (1970) 58-64.
Kister, M., "Notes on Some New Texts from Qumran," JJS 44 (1993) 282-286.

Dead Sea Scrolls